Anopedias is a genus of parasitoid wasps belonging to the family Platygastridae.

The genus was first described by Förster in 1856.

The species of this genus are found in Northern Europe and Northern America.

Species:
 Anopedias lacustris
 Anopedias obscurus

References

Platygastridae
Hymenoptera genera